Şoray Uzun (born 9 June 1967) is a Turkish comedian, writer and television host.

He has been the host of the popular game show Cevap Soruda on TRT 1 in 2013 and of 7 de 7, the Turkish version of Quizz or Buzz on ATV in 2014.

He is married and has 2 children.

Cinema 
Cumhuriyet (1998)
İstanbul 24 Saat (1996)  
Denize Hançer Düştü (1992) 
Salıncakta Üç Kişi (1988)
Yalnızlık Bir Şarkıdır (1987)

Television 
Zengin Kız Fakir Oğlan (2014) – Himself, guest appearance
Çocuklar Duymasın – (2013) Korhan, guest appearance
Seksenler (2012–2017) – Ahmet
Sonradan Görme (2005) – Bülent
Öyle Bir Sevda ki (2002)
Zülküf ile Zarife (2000)
Köstebek (1999)
Ruhsar (1998) – Elvis Presley, guest appearance
Baskül Ailesi (1997) – Güven
Süt Kardeşler (1996)
Evdekiler (1995)
Bizim Ev (1995) – Doctor Kemal
Kaygısızlar (1994–1998) – Kültigin
Geçmişin İzleri (1994)
Barışta Savaşanlar (1993)
Mahallenin Muhtarları (1992) – Ferhat
Karşı Show (1992)
İz Peşinde (1989–1990) – Faruk
Gençler (1989)
Belene (1987)

Television host 

7 de 7, Turkish version of Quizz or Buzz (2014)
Cevap Soruda (2013)
Saha Dışı
Şoray Uzun Yolda

References

External links

1967 births
Living people
Bulgarian Turks in Turkey
Bulgarian emigrants to Turkey
People from Razgrad
Turkish male film actors
Turkish male television actors
Turkish television presenters
Turkish game show hosts